The 1937–38 season was the 29th year of football played by Dundee United, and covers the period from 1 July 1937 to 30 June 1938.

Match results
Dundee United played a total of 36 matches during the 1937–38 season.

Legend

All results are written with Dundee United's score first.
Own goals in italics

Second Division

Scottish Cup

References

Dundee United F.C. seasons
Dundee United